Belarus–Turkey relations are foreign relations between Belarus and Turkey. 

Turkey was the first country to recognize the independence of Belarus. Diplomatic relations were established on 25 March 1992. Turkey has an embassy in Minsk. Belarus has an embassy in Ankara, a Consulate General in Istanbul.

High level visits

Economic Relations
Trade volume between the two countries was 691 million USD in 2019 (Turkish exports/imports: 531/160 million USD).

See also 

 Foreign relations of Belarus
 Foreign relations of Turkey

References 

 
Turkey
Bilateral relations of Turkey